Truce or ceasefire is a temporary stoppage of any armed conflict.

Truce may also refer to:

 Truce (album), a 1982 album by Robin Trower and Jack Bruce
 Truce (group), British R&B trio in the 1990s
 "Truce" (song), a 1998 song by Jars of Clay
 "Truce" (Tom Robinson song), on the 1982 album Cabaret '79
 Truce term, a word used by children to call for a temporary respite
 Ekecheiria, the spirit and personification of truce in Greek mythology
 Flag of truce, an internationally recognized white flag 
 "Truce", a song by Twenty One Pilots from their album Vessel

See also
The Truce (disambiguation)